Milan Records is a record label located in Los Angeles, California specializing in film scores and soundtrack albums. In addition, Milan boasts an extensive electronic catalog which features down-tempo, chillout, and eclectic electronic releases.

In July 2019, Milan was acquired by Sony Masterworks. Coincidentally, Milan was distributed by BMG in the past, which Sony acquired in 2008.

History
Milan Entertainment was founded in 1978 by Emmanuel Chamboredon, who is still the CEO and President of the company.  In the 1980s, Milan branched off to include Editions Milan Music and Editions Jade, the  brand name under which all spiritual and classical music would fall.  Milan Records US was established first in NYC in the late 1980s.  It later relocated to Los Angeles, CA.  Editions Milan Music became the Milan Records of today, at the forefront of music and film with soundtrack releases like The Secret in Their Eyes, Resident Evil: Afterlife, Pan's Labyrinth, The Queen, and Flags of Our Fathers, along with new artists releases, in the electronic genre, Emilie Simon or in the bluegrass genre, The Devil Makes Three.

Discography
Soundtracks

 12 Rounds
 12 Strong
 2067
 The 4400
 The A-Team
 Aeon Flux
 After the Wedding
 Akira
 Alex Rider: Operation Stormbreaker
 Alfie
 Alien: Covenant
 Alita: Battle Angel
 Alone in the Dark
 Alpha Dog
 Army of the Dead
 The Angry Birds Movie
 The Angry Birds Movie 2
 Apt Pupil
 Atlantics
 Backdraft
 The Bad News Bears
 Bad Santa
 Bad Santa 2
 Bad Trip
 Barnyard
 Battle for Haditha
 Battle Royale
 Beavis and Butthead Do America
 Black Swan
 Bloodrayne
 Bloodshot
 Bob's Burgers
 BoJack Horseman
 The Boss Baby
 Brazil
 Breakfast on Pluto
 The Brothers Grimm
 Captain Underpants: The First Epic Movie
 Chef
 Child's Play
 Clockstoppers
 The Condemned
 Cooties
 The Comebacks
 Congo
 The Counterfeiters
 Cowboy Bebop
 Cowboy Bebop: The Movie
 Crank
 Crank: High Voltage
 The Croods
 Cutthroat Island
 Dance Flick
 Dark Phoenix
 Date Movie
 Dead Silence
 Deadpool
 Deadpool 2
 Death Sentence
 Death Wish
 Deficit
 Disaster Movie
 Dodgeball: A True Underdog Story
 Dogville / Manderlay Dolls Doogal Doom Dragonball: Evolution The Elephant Man Elite Squad The Emoji Movie Epic Epic Movie EuroTrip Event Horizon Factotum Family Guy Fantastic Four Fantasy Island Flags of Our Fathers Fugitive Pieces Gamer The General's Daughter Gettysburg The Gettysburg Address Ghost Ghostbusters (2016)
 Ghost in the Shell (1995)
 Ghost in the Shell (2017)
 Good Burger The Green Inferno Hans Zimmer: Good Morning America! Hans Zimmer: The British Years The Happening Hard Rain Harsh Times A Haunted House A Haunted House 2 Hisaishi Meets Miyazaki Home Horton Hears a Who! The Host Hostel Hostel: Part II Hotel Rwanda Hotel Transylvania 2 Hotel Transylvania 3: Summer Vacation House of the Dead I (Heart) Huckabees Independence Day: Resurgence Infamous The Interview Into Great Silence The Island It's Always Sunny in Philadelphia Jackass: The Movie Jackass 3D Jackass Number Two Jackass Presents: Bad Grandpa Jigsaw Jimmy Neutron: Boy Genius Keyhole Kill La Kill Killer Joe The King's Speech Knowing Lara Croft: Tomb Raider Lara Croft Tomb Raider: The Cradle of Life The Last Airbender Letters from Iwo Jima Little Children Little Witch Academia The Love Guru The Man in the Iron Mask The Manchurian Candidate March of the Penguins Marilyn Hotchkiss' Ballroom Dancing & Charm School The Marine Match Point Max Payne Meet the Spartans Melinda and Melinda The Menu Miami Vice Midway Millennium Actress Millions Moro No Brasil Mr. Brooks Mr. Nobody Mr. Peabody & Sherman 
 My Hero Academia: Heroes Rising Nagasaki: Memories of My Son Naked Lunch Ninja Scroll No One Knows About Persian Cats One Last Kiss
 Old Fashioned
 Pan's Labyrinth
 Paprika
 Paranoia Agent
 Parasite
 Payback
 Penguins of Madagascar
 Perfect Blue
 Predators
 The Predator
 The Prize Winner of Defiance, Ohio
 Promare
 Prometheus
 The Purge
 The Purge: Anarchy
 The Purge: Election Year
 The Queen
 Rambo
 Rambo: First Blood
 Rambo: First Blood Part II
 Rambo III
 Rambo: Last Blood
 Rampage
 Rat Race
 Red Hill
 Resident Evil
 Resident Evil: Afterlife
 Resident Evil: Apocalypse
 Resident Evil: The Final Chapter
 Resident Evil: Extinction
 Resident Evil: Retribution
 The Revenant
 Robots
 The Rugrats Movie
 Rugrats Go Wild
 Rugrats in Paris: The Movie
 Sausage Party
 Saw
 Saw II
 Saw III
 Saw IV
 Saw V
 Saw VI
 Saw 3D
 Scary Movie
 Scary Movie 2
 Scary Movie 3
 Scary Movie 4
 Scary Movie 5
 Scream
 Scream 2
 Scream 3
 Scream 4
 The Secret in Their Eyes (2009)
 The Secret in Their Eyes (2015)
 See No Evil
 Sky Captain and the World of Tomorrow
 Sonic the Hedgehog
 Soul Plane
 South Park: Bigger, Longer, and Uncut
 Spider-Man: Into the Spiderverse
 Spirited Away
 The SpongeBob SquarePants Movie
 The SpongeBob Movie: Sponge Out of Water
 Spy Kids
 Spy Kids 2: The Island of Lost Dreams
 Spy Kids 3-D: Game Over
 Spy Kids 4-D: All the Time in the World
 Stargate
 Stargate SG-1
 Step Sisters
 Stomp the Yard
 Stoned
 Strange Wilderness
 Street Fighter: The Legend of Chun-Li
 Superhero Movie
 The Talented Mr. Ripley
 Tank Girl
 Team America: World Police
 Terminator: Dark Fate
 Terminator Genisys
 Tokyo Godfathers
 Tomb Raider
 Transformers
 Transformers: Age of Extinction
 Transformers: Dark of the Moon
 Transformers: The Last Knight
 Transformers: Revenge of the Fallen
 Trolls
 The Truman Show
 Tsotsi
 Turbo
 The Usual Suspects
 Vampires Suck
 We Were Soldiers
 Wedding Crashers
 The Weather Man
 What Just Happened?
 The Wheel of Time
 The Wild Thornberrys Movie
 Willard
 The Winter in Lisbon
 Without a Paddle
 The Wolverine
 Wonderful Days
 The World's Fastest Indian
 X-Men: Apocalypse
 X-Men: Days of Future Past
 X-Men: First Class
 You Got Served
 Zombieland
 Zombieland: Double Tap
 Zoolander
 Zoolander No. 2

Artists and Compilations

 Aaron Beaumont
 Alaska In Winter
 Alexa Vega
 APPART
 Aqua Velvets: Guitar Noir. .ArtDontSleep presents: From LA with Love
 Asia Argento Vs. Antipop
 Ástor Piazzolla
 Ástor Piazzolla "Live at the Montreal Jazz Festival"
 A Tribute to Che Guevara - Hasta Siempre!
 Bernardo Sandoval
 Cliff Martinez
 Clint Mansell
 Dizzy Gillespie
 Emilie Simon
 Emily Jane White
 Eugenia Leon
 Five Senses (In celebration of Grand Hyatt Tokyo's 5th anniversary)
 From Leaf to Feather
 Ivan Colon
 John Beltran
 Richard Galliano
 Ryuichi Sakamoto
 Santino
 Stefano Lentini
 Tex Avery
 The Dead Trees
 The Devil Makes Three
 The Five Corners Quintet
 The Landau Orchestra
 The Mint Chicks
 The Politik
 Hikaru Utada
 West Indian Girl
 The Aqua Velvets

References

External links
 Official site
 Soundtrack.net

American record labels
Soundtrack record labels
Sony Music